The 4 arrondissements of the Ille-et-Vilaine department are:
 Arrondissement of Fougères-Vitré, (subprefecture: Fougères) with 106 communes. The population of the arrondissement was 184,039 in 2016.  
 Arrondissement of Redon, (subprefecture: Redon) with 50 communes.  The population of the arrondissement was 102,157 in 2016.  
 Arrondissement of Rennes, (prefecture of the Ille-et-Vilaine department: Rennes) with 109 communes. The population of the arrondissement was 599,717 in 2016.  
 Arrondissement of Saint-Malo, (subprefecture: Saint-Malo) with 68 communes. The population of the arrondissement was 165,866 in 2016.

History

In 1800 the arrondissements of Rennes, Fougères, Montfort, Redon, Saint-Malo and Vitré were established. The arrondissements of Montfort and Vitré were disbanded in 1926. In 2010 the arrondissement of Fougères was renamed Fougères-Vitré, and it absorbed the six cantons of Argentré-du-Plessis, Châteaubourg, La Guerche-de-Bretagne, Retiers, Vitré-Est and Vitré-Ouest from the arrondissement of Rennes. 

The borders of the arrondissements of Ille-et-Vilaine were modified in January 2017:
 four communes from the arrondissement of Fougères-Vitré to the arrondissement of Rennes
 one commune from the arrondissement of Redon to the arrondissement of Rennes
 five communes from the arrondissement of Rennes to the arrondissement of Fougères-Vitré
 seven communes from the arrondissement of Rennes to the arrondissement of Saint-Malo

References

Ille-et-Vilaine